Tyreece Obiora Onyeka (born 1 August 2001) is an English professional footballer who last played as a forward for EFL League One side Crewe Alexandra. He became a free agent on 30 June 2022.

Career
A graduate of Crewe Alexandra's Academy, he signed a professional contract in 2020. In October 2021, he joined the Northern Premier League Premier Division side Matlock Town on a month-long loan before having a similar spell at Stalybridge Celtic in December that year.

Upon returning to Crewe, he made his debut for the club in their 0–0 home draw against Shrewsbury Town in League One on 15 January 2022, coming on as an 85th minute substitute for Chris Long. Following relegation to League Two, Onyeka was released by Crewe at the end of the 2021–22 season.

Career statistics

References

Living people
English footballers
English Football League players
Crewe Alexandra F.C. players
2001 births
Association football forwards
Matlock Town F.C. players
Stalybridge Celtic F.C. players